Christian Francis (born 7 August 1968) is a Lebanese rower. He competed in the men's single sculls event at the 1992 Summer Olympics.

References

External links
 

1968 births
Living people
Lebanese male rowers
Olympic rowers of Lebanon
Rowers at the 1992 Summer Olympics
Place of birth missing (living people)